Nick Symeoy is an Australian footballer who plays as a defender for Green Gully in the National Premier Leagues Victoria.

External links

References

Living people
Association football defenders
Australian soccer players
Melbourne City FC players
Avondale FC players
Green Gully SC players
A-League Men players
National Premier Leagues players
1994 births